Living the Dream is the 24th studio album by British rock band Uriah Heep, released in September 2018 by Frontiers Records. It was produced by Jay Ruston. Production on the record lasted for 19 days, with the band recording everything "live".

Living the Dream was made possible via a crowdfunding campaign on PledgeMusic.

Critical reception
The album received positive reviews from critics. Dom Lawson of Classic Rock stated that "Living the Dream is as strong as anything the band have produced in two, maybe three decades." Martin Popoff of Goldmine said the album "finds the band putting aside any of their recent technological or stylistic nods to modernity in exercise of a defiance that leaves only pure and timeless Heep jubilance".

Track listing

Personnel 
Uriah Heep
 Mick Box – guitar, backing vocals
 Phil Lanzon – keyboards, backing vocals
 Bernie Shaw – lead vocals
 Russell Gilbrook – drums, percussion
 Dave Rimmer – bass guitar, backing vocals

Production
Jay Ruston – producer, engineer

Charts

References 

Uriah Heep (band) albums
2018 albums
Frontiers Records albums